Acetoacetanilide is an organic compound with the formula CH3C(O)CH2C(O)NHC6H5.  It is the acetoacetamide derivative of aniline.  It is a white solid that is poorly soluble in water.  It and many related compounds (prepared from various aniline derivatives) are used in the production of organic pigments called arylide yellows.

Preparation and reactions
Acetoacetanilide is prepared by acetoacetylation of aniline using diketene.

To make the dyes, acetoacetanilides are coupled to diazonium salts, "azo coupling".

See also
 C10H11NO2

References

Anilides